Juneau is the capital city of Alaska, United States.

Juneau may also refer to:

Places
Juneau, Pennsylvania, a populated place in Indiana County, Pennsylvania, United States
Juneau, Wisconsin, a city in Wisconsin, United States
Juneau County, Wisconsin, a county in Wisconsin, United States
Juneau Icefield, or Juneau Icecap
Mount Juneau, a mountain of Alaska, United States
Juneau mining district, a gold mining area in Alaska, United States
Roman Catholic Diocese of Juneau

Ships
Juneau-class cruiser, a class of United States Navy light cruisers
USS Juneau (CL-52), World War II US Navy cruiser
USS Juneau (CL-119), US Navy ship
USS Juneau (LPD-10), Austin-class amphibious transport
SS Solomon Juneau, Liberty ship

Other uses
Juneau (surname)
Juneau (band), pop-punk band from Houston, Texas
"Juneau" (song), song by Funeral for a Friend on the album Casually Dressed & Deep in Conversation